The Individual normal hill/10 km competition at the FIS Nordic World Ski Championships 2021 was held on 26 February 2021.

Results

Ski jumping
The ski jumping part was held at 10:15.

Cross-country skiing
The cross-country skiing part was held at 16:00.

References

Individual normal hill/10 km